A charterhouse is a monastery of Carthusian monks. The English word is derived by phono-semantic matching from the French word chartreuse  and it is therefore sometimes misunderstood to indicate that the houses were created by charter, a grant of legal rights by a high authority.

The actual namesake is instead the first monastery of the order, the Grande Chartreuse, which St Bruno of Cologne established in a valley of the Chartreuse Mountains in 1084.

The London Charterhouse was the first English site to which this English version of the word was applied.

See also 
 Certosa (disambiguation), the Italian name for a Carthusian monastery
 Charterhouse (disambiguation)
 Chartreuse (disambiguation), the French name for a Carthusian monastery
 List of Carthusian monasteries

References

Carthusian Order
Christian monasteries